Cyril Mourgine (born 14 March 1975) is a Mauritian former international footballer who played as a defender. He won 33 caps and scored 3 goals for the Mauritius national football team between 2001 and 2007.

References

1975 births
Living people
Mauritian footballers
Mauritius international footballers
Mauritian Premier League players
AS Port-Louis 2000 players
Pamplemousses SC players

Association footballers not categorized by position